The Texarkana Panthers are a franchise of the American Basketball Association based in the Texarkana metropolitan area in Arkansas and Texas. The team plays in the Southwest Division. Although the Panthers are considered to represent southwest Arkansas (and Texarkana, Arkansas, in particular), the team plays its home games in Hooks, Texas at the Hooks High School Gymnasium. Their inaugural season was the 2013-14 ABA season in which they achieved a record of 1-5.

History
When the team was formed in June 2013 by CEO/Owner Torrell Johnson, it was sometimes referred to as the "Twin City Texarkana Panthers," but that name was never official. Torrell Johnson founded the club because he had always wanted to own his own franchise, and he also wanted to make a difference for the youth in the Texarkana region. Johnson, who grew up in nearby Waldo, Arkansas, started the team with support from his sister and president of the organization, Krystal Johnson.

Some of the first tryouts for the initial 2013-14 team were held on June 22, 2013 at Columbia Christian School in Magnolia, Arkansas. Tryouts for the Panthers' dance team, Purple Illusion, took place on June 29, 2013 in Magnolia.

The team played its first game on November 21, 2013 against the Shreveport-Bossier Mavericks at Hirsch Memorial Coliseum in Shreveport, Louisiana. The first home game for the club was played on December 28, 2013 against the Lake City Kingdom Riders. Community outreach has been a main driving point behind the Panthers' organization. Because of this, they have hosted numerous awareness and appreciation nights, including an HIV awareness night and a military personnel appreciation night.

Season-by-Season Breakdown

References

External links
Texarkana Panthers Official Website
Texarkana Panthers Facebook Page
Texarkana Panthers YouTube Page

Defunct American Basketball Association (2000–present) teams
Basketball teams in Arkansas
Basketball teams in Texas
Texarkana, Arkansas
Texarkana, Texas
Basketball teams established in 2013